Bracharthron was a genus of moths of the family Erebidae erected by George Hampson in 1891.

The Global Lepidoptera Names Index and Butterflies and Moths of the World describe it as a synonym of Lysimelia Walker, [1859] but Lepidoptera and Some Other Life Forms describes it as a synonym of Lithilaria Rosenstock, 1885.

References

Herminiinae